The individual eventing competition was one of six equestrian events on the Equestrian at the 1984 Summer Olympics programme. Dressage and stadium jumping portions of the competition were held at the Santa Anita Racetrack in Arcadia, California, the endurance stage was held at Fairbanks Ranch, California.

The competition was split into three phases:

Dressage (29–30 July)
Riders performed the dressage test.
Endurance (1 August)
Riders tackled roads and tracks, steeplechase and cross-country portions.
Jumping (3 August)
Riders jumped at the show jumping course.

Results

References

External links
1984 Summer Olympics official report Volume 2, Part 2. p. 381. 

Individual eventing